In set theory, the successor of an ordinal number α is the smallest ordinal number greater than α.  An ordinal number that is a successor is called a successor ordinal.

Properties
Every ordinal other than 0 is either a successor ordinal or a limit ordinal.

In Von Neumann's model
Using von Neumann's ordinal numbers (the standard model of the ordinals used in set theory), the successor S(α) of an ordinal number α is given by the formula

Since the ordering on the ordinal numbers is given by α < β if and only if α ∈ β, it is immediate that there is no ordinal number between α and S(α), and it is also clear that α < S(α).

Ordinal addition

The successor operation can be used to define ordinal addition rigorously via transfinite recursion as follows:

and for a limit ordinal λ

In particular, . Multiplication and exponentiation are defined similarly.

Topology
The successor points and zero are the isolated points of the class of ordinal numbers, with respect to the order topology.

See also
Ordinal arithmetic
Limit ordinal
Successor cardinal

References

Ordinal numbers